Conservative Friends of Gibraltar was a lobby group within the Conservative Party opposed to any joint sovereignty of Gibraltar with Spain.

Objectives 
The central objective of C.F.G. was, as its Founding Declaration stated: 

To promote and defend the British Overseas Territory of Gibraltar within the Conservative Party, the United Kingdom, the Commonwealth, and beyond. 

Related objectives of C.F.G. included: 

For Gibraltar to remain British in its entirety and in perpetuity. 
To oppose any negotiations or agreements about the future of Gibraltar that are contrary to the wishes of the Gibraltarian people. 
To expose the illegitimacy of Spain's claim to Gibraltar. 
To promote a settled constitutional status for Gibraltar.
CFG shall work to promote these objectives first and foremost within the Conservative Party, seeking through reasoned argument and debate to have them made official Party policy. CFG shall also, though, work to promote these objectives to a wider audience wherever possible.

Committee

Honorary officers

President - unknown 
Deputy President - Sir Nicholas Winterton 
Vice President - Tim Loughton M.P. 
Vice President - Murdo Fraser M.S.P.

Elected officers

Chairman - Andrew Rosindell M.P. 
Deputy Chairman - Jamie White 
Deputy Chairman - Holly Farrow 
Deputy Chairman and Treasurer - Alex Stafford 
Executive Secretary - Stephen Coleman 
Parliamentary Monitor - Sean O'Shea 
Press and Publicity Officer - Anita Vukomanovic

External links
Conservative Friends of Gibraltar

Politics of Gibraltar
Organisations associated with the Conservative Party (UK)